The Georges Matheron Lecture Series is sponsored by the International Association for Mathematical Geosciences (IAMG) to honor the legacy of the French engineer Georges François Paul Marie Matheron, known as the founder of geostatistics and a co-founder (together with Jean Serra) of mathematical morphology. The Georges Matheron Lecture is given by a scientist with proven research ability in the field of spatial statistics or mathematical morphology. It is presented annually if an eligible and worthy nominee is found. The first recipient of the award was Jean Serra, for a long time a scientists with the  Centre of Mathematical Morphology, Fontainebleau.  Serra delivered the first lecture at the IAMG conference in Liège, Belgium in 2006. The IAMG Lectures Committee seeks nominations and makes the selection.

Awardees

|- 
|{{sortname|No Award} - -- 
|--
|2021
|--
|}

See also

 List of geology awards
 List of geophysics awards
 List of mathematics awards

References 

Awards of the International Association for Mathematical Geosciences
Awards established in 2006
International awards
Mathematical morphology